Joseph Dominick Andruzzi (born August 23, 1975) is a former American football offensive guard.

College career
Andruzzi played college football at Southern Connecticut State University in New Haven, Connecticut, where he majored in special education. He played every position on the offensive line and started all four years.   Andruzzi was a Division II All-American his junior and senior years as well as an offensive team captain during his senior season.
Andruzzi played high school football at Tottenville High School in his hometown of Staten Island, New York City, New York.  He was a classmate of Major League baseball All Star starting pitcher Jason Marquis,a teammate of Adewale Ogunleye, defensive end for the Miami Dolphins and then the Chicago Bears and also Ed Lozada(AE Stevenson HS in the Bronx, NY), Semi-Pro football Hall of Fame inductee and member of the five-time champion NY Bandits(USFL).

Professional career
In 1997, Andruzzi was picked up as an undrafted rookie free agent by the Green Bay Packers. He was allocated by the Packers in February 1998 to play football in Scotland for NFL Europe. Andruzzi was released from the Packers after three seasons.  He was then signed by the New England Patriots in 2000, where he played five seasons and earned three Super Bowl rings. In recognition of his contributions, Andruzzi received the Ed Block Courage Award in 2002 and the first Ron Burton Community Service Award in 2003.  Andruzzi became a free agent in February 2005 and was signed by the Cleveland Browns. He played with them for two seasons.

Cancer experience and charitable mission
In 2001, Andruzzi and his wife, Jen, were introduced to C.J. Buckley, who had an inoperable brain tumor. The families became very close and, therefore, it was devastating when C.J. died late in 2002. Always driven to help others in need, the couple launched the C.J. Buckley Brain Cancer Research Fund at Children's Hospital.

On May 30, 2007, Andruzzi was diagnosed with non-Hodgkin's Burkitt's lymphoma, predicted to double in size in just 24 hours. The family relocated back to New England where Andruzzi had an aggressive form of chemotherapy treatment over three months at Dana–Farber Cancer Institute and Brigham and Women's Hospital. Andruzzi's last treatment was on August 6, 2007, after which he spent the following year at home in recovery.

After completing treatment, the Andruzzi family founded the Joe Andruzzi Foundation in 2008. They are committed to tackling cancer's impact by providing financial assistance for patients and their families as well as funding pediatric brain cancer research.  Andruzzi received the 2015 Man of the Year award from the Walter Camp Football Foundation.

Personal life
Andruzzi has three brothers.  All three are members of the New York City Fire Department, and responded to the attacks on the World Trade Center on September 11, 2001. During pregame introductions at the next game on September 23, Andruzzi ran out with an American flag in each hand. His brothers were honored at midfield prior to kickoff.

On April 15, 2013, Andruzzi's foundation was hosting an event at a restaurant on Boylston Street in Boston when the Boston Marathon bombing occurred; the second bomb detonated directly outside the restaurant. In the aftermath, he was photographed carrying an injured woman. Andruzzi's friend, former Patriots linebacker Matt Chatham, was also present, and uninjured.

References

External links
Joe Andruzzi Foundation

1975 births
Living people
American football offensive linemen
Southern Connecticut State Owls football players
Green Bay Packers players
New England Patriots players
Cleveland Browns players
Scottish Claymores players
Sportspeople from Brooklyn
Sportspeople from Staten Island
Players of American football from New York City
Ed Block Courage Award recipients